The New Hebrides Plate, sometimes called the Neo-Hebridean Plate, is a minor tectonic plate located in the Pacific Ocean, near the island country of Vanuatu. The plate is bounded on the southwest by the Indo-Australian Plate which is subducting below it.  The New Hebrides Trench is seismically active, producing

See also
 List of earthquakes in Vanuatu

References

Citations 
 

Tectonic plates
Geology of the Pacific Ocean